Bert Roesems (born 14 October 1972, in Halle, Vlaams-Brabant), is a Belgian former professional road bicycle racer.

Major results

1996
 1st  Amateur Time Trial Champion
 1st Stage 4 Tour de Liège
 1st Stage 5 Tour de Liège
1997
 1st Overall, Wielerweekend Zeeuws-Vlaanderen
 3rd Belgian National Time Trial Championships
1998
 1st Kustpijl
1999
 1st Overall Tour de la Somme
1st Stage 2 ITT
 1st Stage 2 ITT OZ Wielerweekend
 2nd Belgian National Time Trial Championships
 2nd Circuit Franco-Belge
1st Stage 3
2000
 1st Leeuwse Pijl
2001
 1st  Pursuit Champion
 1st Brussels-Ingooigem
 1st Stage 3, Tour de la Somme
 2nd Belgian National Time Trial Championships
 2nd Overall Tour de Wallonie
1st Stage 5 ITT
2002
 2nd Belgian National Time Trial Championships
 8th Overall Tour of Belgium
1st Prologue
 8th Overall Postgirot Open
1st Stage 1a ITT
 13th World Time Trial Championship
2003
 1st GP Denain
 1st Stage 5 ITT Course de la Solidarité Olympique
 1st Stage 3 ITT GP Erik Breukink
 3rd Belgian National Time Trial Championships
 9th World Time Trial Championship
2004
 1st  Belgian National Time Trial Championships
 1st Overall, Niedersachsen-Rundfahrt
1st Stage 3
 1st Chrono des Herbiers ITT
 1st Stage 4a ITT Tour of Belgium
 13th World Time Trial Championship
2005
 1st Brussels-Ingooigem
 2nd Belgian National Time Trial Championships
2006
 1st Nokere Koerse
 2nd Belgian National Time Trial Championships
 8th Paris–Roubaix

References

External links

1972 births
Living people
Belgian male cyclists
People from Halle, Belgium
Cyclists from Flemish Brabant